Events in the year 1877 in Portugal.

Incumbents
Monarch: Luís I 
President of the Council of Ministers: Fontes Pereira de Melo (until 5 March), António José de Ávila (from 5 March)

Events
 4 November - Inauguration of the Maria Pia Bridge, in Porto.
 Opening of the Campanhã railway station, in Porto.

Births
 2 November - Teixeira de Pascoaes, poet (died 1952)

Deaths
 13 September - Alexandre Herculano, novelist, historian (born 1810)

See also
List of colonial governors in 1877#Portugal

References

 
Portugal
Years of the 19th century in Portugal
Portugal